Cyrtodactylus boreoclivus is a species of gecko endemic to Papua New Guinea.

References

Cyrtodactylus
Reptiles described in 2011